Jacob Marcaria (died 1562) is best known as operator of the Jewish printing press in Trento in the period from 1558 to 1562. 

The press was licensed under Joseph Ottolengo, a German rabbi to whom Cardinal Cristoforo Madruzzo had granted the privilege of printing Hebrew books. Marcaria also practiced as a physician. Marcaria edited several of the works himself, and in some cases is thought to have in fact authored works published under other writers' names. His best known work is probably Kitzur Mizrachi a summary of Elijah Mizrachi's Sefer ha-Mizrachi.

External links
Riva Di Trento, jewishencyclopedia.com
 Resources in Jewish History: The Paratexts of Jacob Marcaria: Addressing the (Imagined) Reader in Mid-Sixteenth-Century Italy

16th-century Italian Jews
1562 deaths
Year of birth unknown
People from Trento